Ptycanthera is a genus of flowering plants belonging to the family Apocynaceae.

Its native range is Cuba to Hispaniola.

Species:

Ptycanthera oblongata 
Ptycanthera ovatifolia

References

Apocynaceae
Apocynaceae genera
Taxa named by Joseph Decaisne